The NASCAR Hall of Fame, located in Charlotte, North Carolina, honors drivers who have shown expert skill at NASCAR driving, all-time great crew chiefs and owners, broadcasters and other major contributors to competition within the sanctioning body.

History and construction
NASCAR committed to building a Hall of Fame and on March 6, 2006, the City of Charlotte was selected as the location. Ground was broken for the $160 million facility on January 26, 2007, and it officially opened on May 11, 2010, with the inaugural class inducted the day following the 2010 NASCAR Sprint All-Star Race. In addition to the Hall of Fame, the NASCAR Plaza, a 20-story office building, opened in May 2009. The  structure serves as the home of Hall of Fame-related offices, NASCAR Digital Media, NASCAR's licensing division, as well as NASCAR video game licensee Dusenberry Martin Racing (now known as 704Games). Other tenants include the Charlotte Regional Partnership and Lauth Property Group. Richard Petty and Dale Inman helped unveil the first artifact at the Hall of Fame—the Plymouth Belvedere that Petty drove to 27 wins in 1967.

The City of Charlotte was responsible for the construction of the building and is the owner of the NASCAR Hall of Fame. However, it is operated by the Charlotte Regional Visitors Authority. Winston Kelley is the NASCAR Hall of Fame executive director. Internationally renowned Pei Cobb Freed & Partners led the design effort, and Leslie E. Robertson Associates were the structural engineers. Little Diversified Architectural Consulting based in Charlotte is the local architectural firm overseeing many aspects of design and construction of the project. LS3P Associates, Ltd. was the associate architect for the office tower. Tobin Starr + Partners served as site architect, providing full-time representation for Pei Cobb Freed & Partners during construction. Engineering and fabrication of the stainless steel Möbius strip that wraps around the structure was completed by Zahner, of Kansas City. Exhibition design is by Ralph Appelbaum Associates, and exhibition lighting by Technical Artistry. Tobin Starr + Partners is architect-of-record for exhibit and auditorium spaces. Jaros, Baum & Bolles (JB&B) was the mechanical, electrical and plumbing engineer. Site excavation and grading services started on May 21, 2007. The facility features a Hall of Fame and a 19-story office tower. The NASCAR Hall of Fame is set on a 150,000 square feet surface. The museum opened on May 11, 2010. In 2009, NASCAR Hall of Fame established a partnership with Buffalo Wild Wings to be its exclusive restaurant partner in Charlotte.

Site selection

Because of stock car racing's roots in and wealth of famous drivers from North Carolina, Charlotte was considered the favorite by many fans and commentators. There are many NASCAR offices in the area and many teams in the three major NASCAR series (Cup, Xfinity and Truck Series) totaling over 73% of motorsports employees in the United States, in what the committee called "NASCAR Valley." The Hall of Fame is in Uptown Charlotte, about 25 minutes south of Charlotte Motor Speedway. The bid was led by NASCAR car owner Rick Hendrick, then Mayor Pat McCrory, and business leaders in Charlotte. Pei Cobb Freed & Partners were enlisted to design the complex, which is near the Charlotte Convention Center.

Hall of Fame building
The building contains the following:

First Floor:
High Octane Theater – A screening room below ground level which shows videos to guests, including a primer video for first-time visitors.
Second Floor:
Ceremonial Plaza – An outdoor "patio" with a video screen.
Glory Road – A 33-degree banked ramp (matching that of Talladega Superspeedway) featuring 18 different cars and saluting 46 past and current tracks.
The Great Hall – Dubbed as the Times Square of the hall, a -by- video screen and rotating exhibits will be staged here.
"Studio 43" – Named in honor of Richard Petty's car number – used for television production.
Third Floor:
Hall of Honor – A 360-degree wall with the honorees enshrined serves as the centerpiece of the building with each enshrinee with their own exhibit.
Transporter and Racecar Simulators – Simulators provided by iRacing.com.
Inside NASCAR – Simulates an actual week in a NASCAR team, from race prep through inspection, practice, time trials and the race.
Fourth Floor:
Heritage Speedway – The seven decade history of NASCAR is focused here, including a glass-enclosed section with historic artifacts from the history of stock car racing.

There is a gift shop, the Hall of Fame Café and a Buffalo Wild Wings restaurant on site. An expansion, which includes a new ballroom, is part of the project.

While most information on the Charlotte bid has been released voluntarily, the Charlotte Observer has asked the state Attorney General for an opinion requiring full disclosure of the financial details.

The self-proclaimed slogan used by Charlotte for the Hall of Fame was "Racing Was Built Here. Racing Belongs Here."  The NASCAR Hall of Fame's current slogan is, "This is our sport.  This is our house."

Other final candidates
The other two cities at the time of the announcement that were in the running were the cities of Atlanta and Daytona Beach.

Other bids
The state of Alabama had been mentioned as a potential candidate location, and was no longer seen as a contender, possibly because Lincoln, Alabama is home to the International Motorsports Hall of Fame, which is not affiliated with NASCAR. The only northern area that considered bidding was in the state of Michigan. Detroit prepared bids, but state officials decided not to submit the proposals. The cities of Richmond, Virginia and Kansas City, Kansas, were among the five finalists, but on January 5, 2006, NASCAR announced they had been eliminated from the running, leaving just Atlanta, Charlotte and Daytona Beach as the remaining cities.

Eligibility and selection process

Eligibility
Former drivers must have been active in NASCAR for at least 10 years and retired for at least three. Starting with the 2015 Hall of Fame nominations that were voted in the 2014 nomination process, the three-year rule is waived for drivers who compete in 30 or more years in NASCAR-sanctioned competition or turn 55 years of age. The rule applies to all NASCAR-sanctioned competitions; some drivers in the Hall of Fame did not participate in the Cup Series.

Non-drivers must have been involved in the industry at least ten years. Some candidates with shorter careers will be considered if there were special circumstances.

Selection process

Nomination
A nominating committee chooses nominees from those who are eligible. The committee consists of:
Seven NASCAR representatives;
NASCAR Hall of Fame Executive Director Winston Kelley;
NASCAR Hall of Fame Historian;
Track owners (Two each from International Speedway Corporation and Speedway Motorsports Inc.), a representative of the other circuits -- Penske Corporation (Indianapolis Motor Speedway), Mattco (Pocono Raceway), World Wide Technology Raceway, and  Road America.
Four track owners from historic short tracks: Bowman Gray Stadium, Rockford Speedway, the Holland Motorsports Complex, and West Coast track operator Ken Clapp.

Induction
After the nomination committee selects the list of candidates, a total of 48 votes are cast by a voting committee consisting of the nominating committee and the following:
14 media representatives: Three each from the National Motorsports Press Association, the Associated Press Sports Editors and the Eastern Motorsports Press Association; one each from current media rights holders Fox Broadcasting Company, Comcast Corporation, Motor Racing Network, Performance Racing Network and Sirius XM NASCAR Radio.
One representative each from the current manufacturers – Chevrolet, Ford and Toyota;
Three retired drivers;
Three retired owners;
Three retired crew chiefs;
The reigning NASCAR Cup Series champion (for the 2023 Hall of Fame, because there was no 2022 Hall of Fame class, the past two Cup Series champions will participate);
One ballot which represents the results of a fan vote on NASCAR.com.

Inductees

A total of 61 individuals have been inducted into the NASCAR Hall of Fame. 47 were inducted as drivers, 26 of whom were inducted solely as drivers. The other 21 were inducted for their accomplishments as drivers, crew chiefs, owners and/or broadcasters. Among non-drivers, 22 were inducted for being owners, 5 as promoters, and 5 for being crew chiefs.

References

External links

Collection of links to articles for all prospective locations
 USA Today article from May 25
Charlotte basks, boasts at Hall groundbreaking

Hall
Auto racing museums and halls of fame
Sports in Charlotte, North Carolina
Museums in Charlotte, North Carolina
Sports museums in North Carolina
Halls of fame in North Carolina
Awards established in 2010
Museums established in 2010
2010 establishments in North Carolina
Skyscrapers in Charlotte, North Carolina